The men's pole vault event at the 1994 Commonwealth Games was held on 19 August at the Centennial Stadium in Victoria, British Columbia.

Results

References

Pole
1994